The 18th Bersaglieri Regiment is an inactive unit of the Italian Army last based in Cosenza in Calabria. The regiment is part of the army's infantry corps' Bersaglieri speciality and was last operationally assigned to the Bersaglieri Brigade "Garibaldi".

History

World War I 
The 18th Bersaglieri Regiment was raised on 31 January 1917 by the depot of the 12th Bersaglieri Regiment in Milan. It received the newly raised battalions LXIX (raised by the 10th Bersaglieri Regiment), LXVII (raised by the 11th Bersaglieri Regiment), and LXVIII (raised by the 12th Bersaglieri Regiment). The regiment immediately entered the front along the Isonzo and distinguished itself rapidly, earning a Gold Medal of Military Valour on 16-17 November 1917 in Fagarè on the shores of the Piave river, where the Royal Italian Army tried to establish the new front after the disastrous defeat at the Battle of Caporetto.

After the war the 18th Bersaglieri Regiment was disbanded on 31 December 1919. The regiment was raised again on 1 April 1935 in preparation for the Second Italo-Ethiopian War, but it was disbanded without having left Italy on 31 December 1936.

World War II 
On 1 February 1942 the depot of the 5th Bersaglieri Regiment in Siena raised the 18th Bersaglieri Regiment again. The regiment was structured as follows:
 
 18th Bersaglieri Regiment
 I Reconnaissance Group (renamed LXVIII Battalion on 15 April 1942)
 1st Armored Car Company (AB41 armored cars)
 2nd Tank Company (L6/40 light tanks)
 3rd Tank Company (L6/40 light tanks)
 4th Motorcyclists Company 
 II Reconnaissance Group (renamed LXIX Battalion on 15 April 1942)
 5th Self-propelled Cannons Company (L40 self-propelled guns)
 6th Anti-aircraft Cannons Company (20/65 anti-aircraft guns)

After a few days the two tank companies were used to raise the LXVII Armored Bersaglieri Battalion, which was sent to the Eastern Front in Ukraine and Russia to join the 3rd Fast Division "Principe Amedeo Duca d'Aosta". Meanwhile the 18th Bersaglieri Regiment was sent to Provence in France on garrison duty. Recalled to Italy in early September 1943 the regiment was disbanded on 8 September 1943 after the Germans occupied Italy.

Cold War

67th Bersaglieri Battalion "Fagarè" 
During the 1975 Italian Army reform the IV Bersaglieri Battalion of the 3rd Armored Infantry Regiment in Persano was renamed 67th Bersaglieri Battalion "Fagarè". The "Fagarè" battalion received the flag and traditions of the 18th Bersaglieri Regiment and joined the Mechanized Brigade "Pinerolo". Bersaglieri battalions created during the reform were named, with two exceptions, for battles in which Bersaglieri units had distinguished themselves: the 67th Bersaglieri Battalion was named for its conduct at Fagarè on 16-17 November 1917, which had earned the regiment a Gold Medal of Military Valour.

Recent times 
As part of its reorganization after the Cold War the Italian Army moved the Bersaglieri Brigade "Garibaldi" from Pordenone in Northern Italy to Caserta in Southern Italy. On 1 July 1991 67th Bersaglieri Battalion "Fagarè" joined the "Garibaldi" brigade. On 20 September 1993 the "Fagarè" battalion was renamed 18th Bersaglieri Regiment without changing size or composition and moved from Persano to Cosenza in Calabria.

A company of the 18th Bersaglieri Regiment was the first Italian unit to deploy to North Macedonia for a possible NATO-led ground invasion of Kosovo during the Kosovo War. The full regiment arrived soon after and together with the other units of the Bersaglieri Brigade "Garibaldi" prepared for a planned ground invasion. After the signing of the Kumanovo Agreement between Yugoslavia and Kosovo Force the regiment was one of the first NATO units to enter Kosovo, where it advanced to the city of Peć, where it took up garrison and peacekeeping duties until 7 September 1999. For its conduct in Kosovo the regiment was awarded a Gold Medal of Army Valour, which was affixed to the regiment's flag and added to the regiment's coat of arms.

After the regiment's return from Kosovo it was re-equipped with Dardo infantry fighting vehicles.

The regiment deployed to Iraq after the end of the Iraq War, arriving in Nasiriyah on 22 June 2003. Taking up garrison and peacekeeping duties in the city the regiment found itself soon embroiled in the Iraqi insurgency. On 7 October 2003 the regiment left Iraq and returned to Italy. For its conduct in Iraq the regiment was awarded a Gold Medal of Army Valour, which was affixed to the regiment's flag and added to the regiment's coat of arms.

On 1 January 2005 the regiment was renamed 1st Bersaglieri Regiment and the flag of the 18th was transferred to the Shrine of the Flags in the Vittoriano in Rome.

See also 
 Bersaglieri

External links
Italian Army Website: 18th Bersaglieri Regiment

References

Bersaglieri Regiments of Italy